Megachile mystacea is a species of bee in the family Megachilidae. It was described by Johan Christian Fabricius in 1775.

References

External links

Mystacea
Insects described in 1775
Taxa named by Johan Christian Fabricius